Loui McConnell (born 21 November 1999) is a professional rugby league footballer who plays as a  for Doncaster RLFC in the Betfred League 1.

Background
Son of Kirsty Green and Lee McConnell, McConnell lived a fun filled childhood, and always knew his dream was to be a rugby star. McConnell played his amateur rugby league with the Oulton Vikings and Methley Warriors. At 15 Loui was picked up by the Leeds Rhinos where he spent 5 years before moving on to the Featherstone Rovers. After a couple of years of being a Flat Capper, McConnell moved onto pastures green and signed with the mighty Doncaster RLFC.

Career

Leeds Rhinos
McConnell made his Super League debut in round 14 of the 2020 Super League season for Leeds against the Catalans Dragons.

Featherstone Rovers
On 12 Jul 2020 it was announced that McConnell had signed for Featherstone Rovers.

Castleford Tigers (loan)
On 31 Jul 2021 it was reported that he had signed for the Castleford Tigers in the Super League on a short-term loan.

References

External links
Leeds Rhinos profile

1999 births
Living people
Castleford Tigers players
Doncaster R.L.F.C. players
English rugby league players
Featherstone Rovers players
Hunslet R.L.F.C. players
Leeds Rhinos players
Rugby league locks
Rugby league players from Leeds